Stella (Italian: "star")  is a neighbourhood of  Naples, southern Italy. The area includes the National Archaeological Museum, stretches north through the Sanità section of the city, up the Capodimonte hill to include the grounds and buildings of the Capodimonte art museum.

References

Quartieri of Naples